Sphaerolichus is a mite genus in the family Sphaerolichidae.

References

External links 

Trombidiformes genera